Gogol. The Beginning is a 2017 Russian fantasy-horror film directed by Yegor Baranov loosely based on works by Nikolai Gogol from the 1832 collection Evenings on a Farm near Dikanka. The title role is played by Alexander Petrov.

Gogol. The Beginning is the first of three films of the project Gogol and the first Russian television series to have a theatrical release. The first episode (film) was nominated for the Best TV CEE Series award at the Serial Killer festival.

Plot

Chapter One. Murders in Dikanka

The year is 1829. Young Nikolai Vasilievich Gogol, a judicial clerk in the Third Section of His Imperial Majesty's Own Chancellery in St. Petersburg, suffers seizures on the job, falling into a semi-conscious state in which he is pursued by strange visions and writes seemingly meaningless words. The timing of his seizures coincides with acts of murder committed elsewhere.

Suddenly Gogol meets with the famous investigator Yakov Petrovich Guro, who immediately notes something unusual about the young clerk: his rambling records are valuable clues to the investigation. The murderer is quickly revealed. That same evening, the insecure Gogol, brought to tears and impotent rage by the harsh criticism of his first work, Hans Küchelgarten, buys up all the copies of the book and burns them. The next morning Gogol is visited by Guro, who warmly supports him and advises him not to lose heart after his first failed attempt at writing. Guro also expresses his gratitude for Gogol's cooperation, adding that he is going to investigate the mysterious murders of girls in the Poltava province near the small village of Dikanka. Gogol, who had a vision of this at night, asks Guro to take him along as assistant and a clerk, since he comes from that area. Guro, sympathetic and intrigued by the young man's seizures and visions, easily consents and they set out on their journey.

Arriving in Dikanka, Gogol and Guro begin an investigation. The murderer is described as the Dark Horseman, and the superstitious population, especially the local investigator Alexander Khristoforovich Binh, is extremely reluctant to help the investigation from St. Petersburg. Gogol meets the wife of landowner Danishevsky, Elisabeth, who admires his creativity and toward whom he begins to feel (as he tries to convince himself) platonic emotions. He also gets acquainted with the landowner Danishevsky himself, a strange and mysterious man who, along with Elisabeth, lives in isolation, despite being so close to the village of Dikanka. During one of Gogol's visions, Oksana (as it turns out later, a rusalka) appears. In exchange for Gogol's help identifying which of the rusalka is actually a witch, who drains her strength from drowned women, Oksana promises to help him in the investigation. Meanwhile, to Guro's surprise and fury, it turns out that similar murders took place 30 years ago and nothing was done to uncover them.

During the next vision, Gogol manages to identify one of the rusalka as the witch, who turns out to be Hannah from the local inn. The next morning Gogol and Guro find a hand at an abandoned mill: the rusalka had found the witch and tried to tear her apart, starting with the hand. Gogol and Guro assume that the rusalka found the Horseman and rush to the inn where they discover Hanna, who is missing a hand—the same hand that was found at the mill. The enraged witch easily copes with Guro, then attacks Gogol, but Binh kills her. The case is solved, and it's time for Gogol and Guro to return to St. Petersburg. But the night before his departure, Gogol is visited by Oksana, who tells him that the real killer is at large, and Hannah was only an accomplice. At the same time, the Horseman and Guro are fighting to the death in a burning barn, which collapses on them both. Everyone believes that Guro and the Dark Horseman died in its wreckage. However, the remains of the Rider are not found. Gogol decides to stay and finish the investigation himself.

That night, the Horseman comes to a shed where Hanna's body lies in a coffin and resurrects her. The Witch begs the Horseman for forgiveness, blaming her failure on Gogol's strange abilities, but the Horseman is deaf to her pleas. The witch's screaming comes from inside the shed.

Chapter Two. The Red Cape
A few days later in Dikanka there is a new murder: Baba Khavronya dies right in the middle of a tryst with the priest, her lover. He raves about a pig's head and a red scroll, the symbol of conjugal infidelity, which, according to the folk lore, the devil throws on the threshold. The murder was arranged as if the Dark Horseman had done it, but during a seizure Gogol paints a linden leaf (in Russian, a "linden" is slang for a fake). After waking, he immediately notices that the sign of the Horseman is drawn with an error. When the murder weapon is found in the house, the husband takes the blame on himself.

In Dikanka, Dr. Leopold Leopoldovich Bomgart comes to Gogol's aid. A man with an exclusively scientific mindset, Bomgart denies the existence of evil spirits. An autopsy shows that Baba Khavronya died not from a wound, but from a rupture of the heart due to utmost terror. Her ghost begins to appear and threaten the stepdaughter Paraska, who will soon have a wedding. Gogol once again is tormented by visions about Oksana and Elizabeth: according to the former, in order to learn how to manage his gift, he must give up worldly attachments and, first and foremost, his feelings for Liza.

Gogol finds the solution with the help of the blacksmith Vakula and Dr. Bomgart: a candle Paraska had bought from some gypsies, a candle that was lit during Khavronya's tryst with the priest, contains hallucinogens. (Gogol breathes a bit of smoke from this candle and sees one of his greatest fears: Pushkin mocking his work.) Realizing that the murderer is Paraska, who staged the devil's attack so that her stepmother would not stop her from getting married, Gogol exposes her, but she escapes into the forest. With the help of sorcery the ghost of Khavronya catches Paraska and gives her to the Horseman as a new sacrifice. Gogol, Vakula, Vakula's servant Yakim, and Dr. Bomgart try to catch up, and upon hearing her cry they want to help, but the way is blocked by the witchcraft of the ghost Khavronya. Only thanks to the candle, lit by Dr. Bomgart, the heroes manage to stop the witchcraft. But an unexpected event occurs: the ghost of Khavronya, once faced with Gogol, suddenly becomes terrified and howls "No, do not come near me! Dark one... " and then disappears, leaving Gogol and his friends in perplexity. But they do not have time to contemplate: Paraska is found dead in a boat by the river bank, and on the ground gleams the terrible symbol of the Dark Horseman.

The next morning at the inn, Gogol gathers Dr. Bomgart, the blacksmith Vakula and his servant Yakim, the only people in all of Dikanka he can trust. All three agree to help him in the fight against the terrible enemy. Unbeknownst to everyone in the old mirror appears smiling Oksana. It turns out that among the things of Yakov Petrovich Guro there was a trunk, which he ordered to give to Gogol in case of unforeseen circumstances. Vakula easily opens the lock of the chest, to which no one could find the key. When touching the lock Gogol gets a new vision: the next victim of the Dark Horseman could be Liza. The smile disappears from Oksana's face, and she leaves.

The chapter and the first film ends with Yakov Petrovich Guro, who supposedly died in the barn fire, observing the village of Dikanka from the top of a cliff.

Cast
Alexander Petrov — Nikolai Vasilyevich Gogol
Oleg Menshikov — investigator Yakov Petrovich Guro
Yevgeny Stychkin — head of the police department, Alexander Khristoforovich Binh
Taisiya Vilkova — Elizaveta (Lisa) Danishevskaya
Artyom Tkachenko  — Alexey Danishevsky
Julia Franz — daughter of the miller, Oksana
Yevgeny Sytiy— servant of Gogol, Yakim
Yan Tsapnik — doctor-pathologist Leopold Leopoldovich Bomgart
Sergey Badyuk — blacksmith Vakula
Martha Timofeeva — daughter of the blacksmith Vakula Vasilina
Valery Rybin — Dark Horseman
Svetlana Kireeva — Khristina
Artyom  Suchkov — scribe Tesak
Yevgeny Kapitonov — Father Bartholomew
Pavel Derevyanko — Alexander Pushkin
Kirill Polukhin — Basavryuk
Dmitry Bykovsky-Romashov — Solopiy Cherevik
Anvar Libabov — the noseless
Yulia Marchenko — Gogol's mother, Maria Hohol-Yanovskaya
Andrey Astrakhantsev — Gogol's father, Vasyl Hohol-Yanovsky
Vitaly Kovalenko — investigator Kovleiskiy
Beata Makovsky — Khavronya

Production
Filming took place in 2016 in the Pskov region and St. Petersburg, where the set of the village of Dikanka was created.

"Gogol. The Beginning" was produced by Alexander Tsekalo's Sreda Production Company, the general director of TV-3 Valery Fyodorovich, the general producer of TV-3 Yevgeny Nikishov (at that time Fedorovich and Nikishov were the producers of TNT) and Artur Janibekyan. The production of one series of "Gogol" cost about 29 000 000 rubles, while the fees of the first part of the film series amounted to 444,485,278 rubles.

Sequels
The film Gogol. Viy was released on April 5, 2018, Gogol. A Terrible Vengeance was released on August 30, 2018. Then the three films will be divided into six episodes. The episodes in question, along with two filler episodes, will be shown on the Russian channel TV-3 in 2019.

References

External links

Films based on works by Nikolai Gogol
Russian horror films
Russian fantasy films
2017 fantasy films
2017 horror films
Television series by Sreda
Russian dark fantasy films